Janet Beihoffer is a Republican serving as the Minnesota National Committeewoman, first elected in 2012.

Education

Beihoffer earned a B.S. in Education from Miami University of Ohio, an MBA in Accounting from the George Washington University and became a registered CPA (now inactive) in Virginia.

Career

Janet Beihoffer was elected to the Republican National Committee as the National Committeewoman for Minnesota in 2012 and re-elected for a second term in 2016. After retiring from her career at IBM where she was a line-of-business marketing manager for five states, she now is an adjunct professor at Metropolitan State University where she teaches Management Information Systems.

Political Background
She developed and implemented statewide poll challenging operations in 2005; became the Statewide Director of Election Operations for the MN GOP  from 2008-2012 and served as the Chair of the Minnesota 2nd Congressional District from 2008-2009. Beihoffer was on the Board of Directors for the Volunteers Enlisted to Assist People from 1990-1998 and the Mount Olivet Lutheran Church Board of Life and Growth from 1998-2004.

Community service

Beihoffer served on the board of directors for the Volunteers Enlisted to Assist People from 1990 to 1998. She later served on the Mount Olivet Lutheran Church Board of Life and Growth from 1998 to 2004.

References

Living people
Minnesota Republicans
Miami University alumni
George Washington University School of Business alumni
People from Lakeville, Minnesota
Year of birth missing (living people)
American accountants
Women accountants